This is an incomplete list of rivers that are at least partially in Spain. The rivers flowing into the sea are sorted along the coast. Rivers flowing into other rivers are listed by the rivers they flow into. Rivers in the mainland Iberian Peninsula can be divided into those belonging to the Mediterranean watershed, those flowing into the Atlantic Ocean and those emptying into the Cantabrian sea (a marginal sea of the Atlantic off the northern coast of the Iberian peninsula).

Tributaries are listed down the page in an downstream direction.

The list begins with the northernmost item of the Mediterranean watershed (close to the French border) and moves clockwise around the Iberian Peninsula.

Outside from the Iberian peninsula mainland, streams in the Canary Islands, the Balearic Islands, Ceuta and Melilla are seasonal watercourses. The Santa Eulàlia river in Ibiza was traditionally considered as the single proper 'river' in the Balearic Islands, but it lost its constant flow by the late 20th-century.

Mediterranean watershed

Catalan basins 
This includes the basins emptying in the Mediterranean Sea located in the coastline north from the Ebro. It has to be noted this leaves out the Garonne and the Ebro, both draining parts of Inner Catalonia, as well as small streams in Catalonia emptying in the Mediterranean south from the Ebro.

Muga ( · 65 km)
Manol ( · 42 km)
Fluvià ( · 98 km)

 ( · 30 km)


Ter ( · 209 km)

 ( · 31 km)
Núria
Rigard
Gurri
Mèder
Riera Major

Güell
Onyar/Oñar ( · 34 km)


Tordera ( · 50 km)
 ( 31 km)
Besòs ( · 50 km)
Congost ( · 41 km)

 ( · 28 km)
Ripoll ( · 40 km)
Llobregat ( · 157 km)

Merlès ( · 47 km)
 ( · 60 km)
Cardener ( · 87 km)
Anoia ( · 58 km)
Foix ( · 49 km)
Gaià/Gayá
Francolí ( · 58 km)

Ebro

 
 Ebro ( · 910 km)
 ( · 28 km; aside from joining the Ebro near Reinosa, the upstream traditional source of the very same Ebro in Fontibre han been recently redescribed as a water spring of the Híjar)
  ( · 35 km)
 Oca ( · 72 km)
 Nela ( · 74 km)
Bayas  ( · 58 km)
 Zadorra ( · 88 km)
 Tirón ( · 64 km)
 Najerilla/Neila ( · 73 km)
Ega ( · 115 km)
Cidacos ( · 79 km)
Aragón ( · 197 km)
  · 51 km)
Irati ( · 80 km)
Arga ( · 149 km)
Alhama ( · 79 km)
Queiles ( · 42 km)
 ( · 80 km)
Jalón ( · 224 km)
Piedra ( · 66 km)
 ( · 64 km)
Jiloca ( · 123 km)
Huerva ( · 135 km)
Gállego ( · 203 km)
 ( · 40 km)
Sotón ( · 52 km)
  ( · 103 km)
  ( · 98 km)
 ( · 35 km)
Guadalope ( · 182 km)
Bergantes ( · 57 km)
Segre ( ·  · 261 km)
Valira/Gran Valira ( · )

 ( · 30 km)

Noguera Pallaresa ( · 143 km)
Sió 
Corb
Noguera Ribagorçana/Noguera Ribagorzana ( · 130 km)

Set
Cinca ( · 177 km)
 ( · 66 km)
 (
 (
Ésera ( · 98 km)
 ( · 60 km)
Alcanadre ( · 138 km)
Matarranya/Matarraña ( · 101 km)

Levante 
This roughly includes the basins emptying in the Mediterranean Sea ranging from those emptying south from the Ebro to the intermittent seasonal watercourses characteristic of the areas near the border between Murcia and the Andalusian province of Almería.

Cenia/Sénia
Mijares/Millars ( · 156 km)
 ( · 32 km)


 ( · 81 km)
/Montlleó ( · 83 km)

 ( · 33 km)
 
Turia/Guadalaviar  (280km)
  ( · 99 km)
 
Ebrón
 /Vallanca

Júcar/Xúquer ( · 498 km)
Huécar ( · 31 km)
Valdemembra ( · 103 km)
Cabriel ( · 263 km)
 ( · 38 km)
/Magro ( · 125 km)
/Cáñoles ( · 63 km)
Serpis ( · 75 km)
Vinalopó ( · 82 km)
Segura ( · 325 km)
Mundo ( · 108 km)
Alhárabe/Moratalla
Mula ( · 61 km)
Guadalentín/Sangonera ( · 95 km)

Andalusian Mediterranean basins 

Almanzora ( · 105 km)
Andarax ( · 62 km)
 ( · 47 km)
Guadalfeo ( · 72 km)
Trevélez ( · 33 km)
Poqueira
  ( · 36 km)
Guadalmedina ( · 48 km)
Guadalhorce ( · 154 km)
  ( · 43 km)
Guadiaro ( · 79 km)
Guadalevín
   ( · 48 km)
  ( · 48 km)

Atlantic watershed
This section features the rivers flowing into the Atlantic Ocean, ranging from the Punta de Tarifa (the meeting point of the Mediterranean and the Atlantic) to the Punta de Estaca de Bares (the conventional boundary between the Atlantic of the Cantabrian Sea, one of the former's marginal seas).

Gulf of Cádiz 

Guadalete ( · 173 km)
Majaceite
San Pedro
Guadalquivir ( · 657 km)
 ( · 182 km)
Guadalimar ( · 167 km)
  ( · 127 km)
 ( · 74 km)
 ( · 70 km)
 ( · 90 km)
 ( · 76 km)
Guadalmellato ( · 111 km)
 ( · 114 km)
 ( · 123 km)
 ( · 111 km)
Genil ( · 337 km)
Darro
 ( · 58 km)
 ( · 117 km)
 ( · 61 km)
Guadaíra ( · 89 km)
Guadiamar ( · 60 km)
Tinto ( · 93 km)
Odiel ( · 121 km)
 
Guadiana ( ·  · 818 km)
 Cigüela
Záncara

 (
Córcoles
Ojuelo
 
 
 

Guadalupe
Zújar
 
 Gévora/Xévora ( · )
Ardila ( ·  · km)
 ( ·  · km)
Chanza ( · )

Tagus 

Tagus/Tajo/Tejo ( ·  · 1007 km; of which 816 km run through Spain and 47 km through the Portugal–Spain border)
Gallo ( · 98 km)
Guadiela ( · 117 km)
 ( · 36 km)
 ( · 62 km)
 ( · 40 km)
 ( · 71 km)
Jarama ( · 194 km)
Lozoya ( · 91 km)
Guadalix ( · 42 km)
Henares ( · 160 km)
 ( · 39 km)
 ( · 38 km)
 ( · 43 km)
 ( · 53 km)
Sorbe ( · 80 km)

Torote ( · 48 km)
Manzanares ( · 87 km)
Tajuña ( · 226 km)
Ungría ( · km)
Algodor ( · 96 km)
Guadarrama ( · 96 km)

 ( · 67 km)
Alberche ( · 182 km)
Gaznata 
Cofio ( · 51 km)
Perales ( · 29 km)
Tiétar ( · 170 km)



Guadyerbas ( · 45 km)
 ( · 27 km)


 Almonte ( · 160 km)
 ( · 84 km)
Gibranzos ( · 37 km)
 ( · 52 km)
 ( · 56 km)
Alagón ( · 201 km)

 ( · 37 km)
 ( · 70 km)
 ( · 71 km)
 ( · 40 km)

Douro 

Douro/Duero ( ·  · 897 km of which 572 km run through Spain and 112 km through the Portugal–Spain border)
Duratón ( · 103 km)
Cega ( · 133 km)
Cerquilla River (30 km)
 ( · 88 km)
Pisuerga ( · 275 km)
 ( · 71 km)
 ( · 58 km)
Odra ( · 65 km)
 ( · 34 km)
Arlanzón ( · 122 km)
 ( · 42 km)
 ( · 50 km)
Arlanza ( · 159 km)



Carrión ( · 178 km)
 ( · 68 km)
Esgueva ( · 100 km)
Adaja ( · 163 km)
Eresma ( · 124 km)
Voltoya
 ( · 100 km)
Trabancos ( · 77 km)
 ( · 63 km)
 Valderaduey ( · 146 km)
Navajos/Ahogaborricos/Bustillo ( · 51 km)
 ( · 115 km)
Salado ( · 35 km) 
Esla ( · 275 km)
Bernesga ( · 76 km)

 ( · 60 km)
Cea ( · 175 km)
Órbigo ( · 97 km)
 ( · 50 km)

 ( · 64 km)
 ( · 95 km)
Tera ( · 138 km)
Negro ( · 51 km)
 · 41 km)
 ( · 68 km)
Mena · 21 km)
 Tormes ( · 247 km)
 Águeda ( · 132 km)
Huebra ( · 122 km)
 Tâmega/Támega ( ·  · 145 km of which 52 km run through Spain)

Lima 
 Lima/Limia ( ·  · 126 km of which 41 km run through Spain)

Minho-Sil 

Minho/Miño ( ·  · 345 km of which the last 75.5 km form the Portugal–Spain border)
  ( · 30 km)
 ( · 42 km)
Sil ( · 225 km)
  ( · 58 km)
 Noceda
 Cúa ( · 60 km)
  ( · 63 km)
  ( · 93 km)
 Lor ( · 50 km)
 Mao ( · 31 km)
 Cabe ( · 49 km)
  ( · 30 km)
Avia ( · 38 km)
Arnoia ( · 88 km)

Barxas/Troncoso/Trancoso ( · )

Rias Baixas and Rias Altas 
 Verdugo (39 km)
 Lérez (60 km)
  (64 km)
 Ulla (126 km)
 Sar (42 km)
Tambre (134 km)
Samo (42 km)
Lengüelle (35 km)
 Xallas (62 km)
Anllóns (55 km)
 (57 km)
 (84 km)

Cantabrian watershed 
This includes the rivers flowing into the Cantabrian Sea (as well as in the case of the Garonne the wider Bay of Biscay) east of the Punta de Estaca de Bares. They are chiefly short streams streaming down the Cantabrian Mountains and the southern slopes of the Pyrenees.

Eo ( · 79 km)
Nalón ( · 129 km)
Narcea ( · 107 km)
Navia ( · 159 km)
Sella ( · 56 km)
 Dobra
Deva ( · 60 km)
Cares  ( · 50 km)
 ( · 50 km)
Saja ( · 58 km)
 ( · 47 km)
Pas ( · 50 km)
Pisueña ( · 33 km)
Miera ( · 39 km)
Asón ( · 39 km)
Gándara
Nervión/Nerbioi ( · 69 km)
Cadagua
Ibaizabal
Oria ( · 66 km)
Leitzaran/Leizarán (37 km)
Urola ( · 55 km)
Urumea ( · 40 km)
Bidasoa ( ·  · 41.6 km of which the last ones form the France–Spain border)
 Baztán ( · 26.8 km)
 Ezkurra ( · 21.6 km)
 Garonne/Garona ( ·  · 602 km of which roughly 40 km run through Spain)

See also 
 List of rivers of Catalonia

References 
Informational notes

Citations

External links 
 Rivers of Spain in INE (Spain)

Spain
Rivers